William Page (17 September 1896 – 1981) was an English professional footballer who played as an inside forward. Three of his brothers, Jack, Louis and Tom, were also professional footballers.

Career statistics
Source:

References

1896 births
1981 deaths
Footballers from Liverpool
English footballers
Association football inside forwards
South Liverpool F.C. (1890s) players
Rochdale A.F.C. players
Port Vale F.C. players
Cardiff City F.C. players
Northampton Town F.C. players
Costains F.C. players
English Football League players